Vasily Georgievich Zhitarev (Russian: Василий Георгиевич Житарев; January 1, 1891 (OS) / January 13, 1891 (NS) – April 13, 1961) was a Russian professional football player who competed in the 1912 Summer Olympics. He was a member of the Russian Olympic squad and played one match in the main tournament as well as one match in the consolation tournament.

Career statistics

International

International goals
Scores and results list Russian Empire's goal tally first.

See also
Football at the 1912 Summer Olympics

References

External links
profile 

1891 births
1961 deaths
Russian footballers
Russia international footballers
Olympic footballers of Russia
Footballers at the 1912 Summer Olympics
FC Dynamo Moscow players
Association football forwards